Dancing On Tables are a Scottish pop-rock band from Dunfermline, Fife, Scotland, who formed in 2014 as bored school friends who happened to play the right instruments. The band consists of Robbie McSkimming (lead vocals, keyboard ), Callum Thomas (lead vocals, guitar), Hamish Finlayson (guitar), Gregor Stobie (bass, backing vocals) and Reece Dobbin (drums).

Beginning with playing friend's parties and school halls, their journey has since seen them play UK arenas with Catfish and the Bottlemen, soundtrack Schuh x Adidas campaign  and be named
by Variety Magazine as one of 10 Brits to Watch for 2018. Others in this list include; Jorja Smith, Edward Holcroft and Sophie Skelton.

In November 2017, the band signed to Nashville based record label LV Music.

In April 2018, Robbie McSkimming appeared as a contestant on the BBC quiz show Pointless.

References

Scottish pop rock music groups